Duluth is a census-designated place (CDP) in Clark County, Washington, United States. The population was 1,544 at the 2010 census.

References

Census-designated places in Clark County, Washington
Census-designated places in Washington (state)